Henry Robert Valence Earle (December 22, 1912 – February 1, 1996) was a Canadian politician. He represented the electoral district of Fortune Bay in the Newfoundland and Labrador House of Assembly from 1962 to 1971 and 1972 to 1975. He was a member of the Liberal Party of Newfoundland and Labrador for his first term and a member of the Progressive Conservative Party of Newfoundland and Labrador for his second. He was born in Fogo, Newfoundland. he served in cabinet under various portfolios, including Minister of Finance, Education, Economic Development, and Public Works & Services.

References

1912 births
1996 deaths
People from Fogo Island, Newfoundland and Labrador
Liberal Party of Newfoundland and Labrador MHAs